Jan Van Rijsselberge is a Belgian creator, designer and producer, who is credited on multiple animated TV series, including Robotboy, Hairy Scary and Santa's Apprentice. After getting a diploma in Animation Film Directing in Gent (Belgium), Jan Van Rijsselberge began his career as an animator and a supervisor. In 1996 he co-directed Lil' Elvis Jones and the Truckstoppers. For over a decade he has been the creative director at Alphanim in Paris, where he created series such as Robotboy, Hairy Scary, X-Duckx, Zombie Hotel, Sophie, Spaced Out, Gawayn, Delta State, Matt's Monsters, Potatoes and Dragons, Ralf the Record Rat, The Mysteries of Alfred Hedgehog, The Baskervilles, Spencer, The Small Giant, and Santa's Apprentice. Jan Van Rijsselberge is currently Studio 100's creative director, working primarily at their Paris office. One of his specialties as of 2010 is taking traditional 2D animated shows such as Maya the Bee and Vicky the Viking and modernizing them for a full CG animation production. In 2013 he created the show Dude, That's My Ghost!

Writing credits

Awards and nominations

References

External links

Belgian animators
Belgian animated film directors
Belgian animated film producers
Belgian television directors
Year of birth missing (living people)
Belgian expatriates in France 
Living people